The Matlock Paper is the third suspense novel by Robert Ludlum, in which a solitary protagonist comes face to face with a massive criminal conspiracy.

Its protagonist, James Barbour Matlock, is an English professor in his 30s who is recruited by the Department of Justice to investigate a drug smuggling ring, led by a mysterious figure named "Nimrod". The novel is set at the fictitious Carlyle University in Connecticut, a thinly disguised Wesleyan University in Middletown, Ludlum's alma mater.

Publication history

1973, US, Dial Press , Pub date April 1973, Hardback
1974, US, Dell , Pub date April 15, 1974, Paperback
1973, UK, Grafton  Pub date July 9, 1973, Hardback
2002, UK, HarperCollins , Pub date April 15, 2002, Paperback

Novels by Robert Ludlum
1973 American novels
Novels set in Connecticut
Wesleyan University
Nimrod